Laurent Thévenot (born 1949) is a French sociologist Professor at the Ecole des Hautes Etudes en Sciences Sociales (Paris).

Career
After initial research on social coding and investments in forms which contribute to action coordination, he co-initiated in France two trends which rejuvenated the critical social sciences, and reached international audience. With Luc Boltanski, he co-authored On Justification 2006 [1991] which analyzes the most legitimate repertoires of evaluation and criticism governing political, economic and social relationships. It originated the French Pragmatic sociology  of critique. Thévenot is also one of the founders of the Economics and Sociology of Conventions which has developed analysis of economical, social and political conventions that regulate uncertain coordination. 

L'action au pluriel (2006, translated in Spanish: 2016, La acción en plural. Una introducción a la sociología pragmática, Buenos Aires, Siglo Veintiuno) widens critical approaches to power through the analysis of oppressions on valued regimes people are empowered through by engaging with the environment and with others, from intimacy to the level of public conventions. This analytical framework has contributed to international research networks on: governing by standards and objectives; the politics of quantification; the evolution of the forms of authority, evaluation, and critique; arts of participation and protest; political ecology.

This framework has been developed and tested in collaborative and comparative research on the political and moral grammars used in differing and making things and issues common. Collaborative programs have compared architectures of communities in Western Europe (European Journal of Cultural and Political Sociology, special issue on 'Politics of Engagement in an Age of Differing Voices' co-edited with Eeva Luhtakallio, 2018 5(1-2)), Russia (Revue d'Etudes Comparatives Est-Ouest, special issue on 'Critiquer et agir en Russie' co-edited with Françoise Daucé et Kathy Rousselet, 2017 48(3-4)) and the United States (Comparing Cultures and Polities: Repertoires of Evaluation in France and the United States, co-edited with Michèle Lamont, Cambridge University Press, 2000).

Laurent Thévenot is a member of the scientific committees of the journals Annales, Histoire, Sciences Sociales , European Journal of Cultural and Political Sociology , Historical Social Research , Laboratorium: Russian Review of Social Research .

He is a permanent member of the French Academy of Agriculture .

He is doctor Honoris Causa of the University of Helsinki  and Universidad Nacional del Altiplano (Puno, Peru) .

Selected publications in English

Pragmatic Sociology and the Extension of Critique: Sociology of Engagements
 2021 (with Y. Mettler), "Bancbigny 2013-", in Y. Mettler, Atlas Europe Square, Urbanomic, MIT Press.
 2020, "How does Politics Take Closeness into Account? Returns from Russia", International Journal of Politics, Culture, and Society, 33(2).
 2019, "What engages. The sociology of justifications, conventions, and engagements, meeting norms", La Revue des droits de l’homme, 16, on line. 
 2018 (with E. Luhtakallio), "Politics of Engagement in an Age of Differing Voices" (introduction to the special issue) European Journal of Cultural and Political Sociology 5(1-2).
 2015, "You Said 'Capital'? Extended Conceptions of Capital and the Analysis of Inequalities and Dominant Powers", Annales Histoire Sciences Sociales 70(1) on line in English.
 2013, "The Human Being Invested in Social Forms. Four Extensions of the Notion of Engagement", in M. Archer and A. Maccarini (ed.), Engaging with the World. Agency, Institutions, Historical Formations, Routledge.
 2012, "Convening the Company of Historians to go into Conventions, Powers, Critiques and Engagements", Historical Social Research, 37(4).
 2011, "Powers and Oppressions Viewed from the Sociology of Engagements: in Comparison with Bourdieu's and Dewey's Critical Approaches of Practical Activities", Irish Journal of Sociology, 19(1), special issue on "Keys Issues in Contemporary Social Theory".
 2007, "The Plurality of Cognitive Formats and Engagements: Moving between the Familiar and the Public", European Journal of Social Theory, 10(3).
 2002, “Which Road to Follow? The Moral Complexity of an 'Equipped' Humanity”, in J. Law John, Annemarie Mol (eds), Complexities: Social Studies of Knowledge Practices, Duke University Press.
 2001, "Pragmatic Regimes Governing the Engagement with the World", in K. Knorr-Cetina, T. Schatzki, E. v. Savigny (eds.), The Practice Turn in Contemporary Theory, Routledge.

On Critique and Justification
 2014, ”Enlarging Conceptions of Testing Moments and Critical Theory. Economies of Worth, On Critique and Sociology of Engagements, in S. Susen and B. Turner (eds.), The Spirit of Luc Boltanski. Essays on the ‘Pragmatic Sociology of Critique’, Anthem Press.
 2006 [1991] (with L. Boltanski), On Justification. The Economies of Worth, Princeton, Princeton University Press.
 2000 (with L. Boltanski), "The Reality of Moral Expectations: a Sociology of Situated Judgment", Philosophical Explorations, 3(1).
 1999 (with L. Boltanski), "The Sociology of Critical Capacity", European Journal of Social Theory, 2(3).
 1983 (with L. Boltanski), "Finding One's Way in Social Space: A Study Based on Games", Social Science Information, 22(4-5).

Convention Theory, Coordination, Evaluation, Quantification,  Regulation, Governing by Standards and Objectives 
 2022, "A new calculable global world in the making: governing through transnational certification standards", in A. Mennicken and R. Salais, (eds.), The New Politics of Numbers: Utopia, Evidence and Democracy, Palgrave.
 2020 (with V. Champeil-Desplats and J. Porta), eds, Modes de normativité et transformations normatives / Modes of normativity and normative transformations (bilingual edition), Paris, IFJD, diffusion LGDJ.
 2019 (with E. Cheyns), "Government by certification standards The consent and complaints of affected communities", La Revue des droits de l’homme, 16, online.
 2019 (with V. Champeil-Desplats and J. Porta), "Introduction : a cooperative and transversal research experience between law and the social sciences", La Revue des droits de l’homme, 16, online.
 2019, "Measure for measure. Politics of quantifying individuals to govern them", Historical Social Research, 44(2).
 2016, "From Codage social to Economie des conventions: A Thirty Years Perspective on the Analysis of Qualification and Quantification Investments", Historical Social Research, 41(2).
 2015, "Certifying the world. Power Infrastructures and Practices in Economies of Conventional Forms", in P. Aspers, and D. Dodd (eds.), Re-Imagining Economic Sociology, Oxford University Press.
 2012, "Law, Economies and Economics. New Critical Perspectives on Normative and Evaluative Devices in Action", Economic Sociology, 14(1).
 2011, "Conventions for Measuring and Questioning Policies. The Case of 50 Years of Policies Evaluations through a Statistical Survey", Historical Social Research, 36(4).
 2009, "Governing Life by Standards. A View from Engagements", Social Studies of Science, 39(5).
 2005 (with F. Eymard-Duvernay, O. Favereau, A. Orléan and R. Salais), "Values, Coordination and Rationality: The Economics of Conventions", in A. Oleinik (ed.), The Institutional Economics of Russia’s Transformations, Ashgate.
 2002, "Conventions of Co-ordination and the Framing of Uncertainty", in E. Fullbrook (ed.), Intersubjectivity in Economics: Agents and Structures, Routledge.
 2001, "Organized Complexity: Conventions of Coordination and the Composition of Economic Arrangements", European Journal of Social Theory, 4(4).
 1984, "Rules and Implements: Investment in Forms", Social Science Information, 23(1).

Political and Cultural Sociology in a Transnational Perspective: Grammars of Commonality in the Plural
 2017 (with C. Lafaye), "An ecological justification? Conflicts in the development of nature", in C. Cloutier, J.-P.Gond, and B. Leca (eds.) Justification, Evaluation and Critique in the Study of Organizations: Contributions from French Pragmatist Sociology. Research in the Sociology of Organizations, Bingley, U.K.: Emerald Group.
 2017, "Arts of replanting common-places alive. Engaging with artful plants to communicate environmental care", in L. M. Thorsen (ed.) Moving plants (catalogue published in conjunction with the exhibition"Moving Plants") Næstved Denmark: Rønnebæksholm.
 2015, "Making Commonality in the Plural, on the Basis of Binding Engagements", in P. Dumouchel and R. Gotoh (eds.), Social Bonds as Freedom: Revising the Dichotomy of the Universal and the Particular, Berghahn.
 2014, "Voicing Concern and Difference. From Public Spaces to Common-Places", European Journal of Cultural and Political Sociology, 1(1).
 2014, “Engaging in the Politics of Participative Art in Practice”, in T. Zembylas, (ed.), Artistic Practices, Routledge.
 2012, “At Home and in a Common World, in a Literary and a Scientific Prose: Ginzburg’s Notes of a Blockade Person”, in E. Van Buskirk, and A. Zorin (eds.), Lydia Ginzburg’s Alternative Literary Identity, Peter Lang.
 2007, "A Science of Life Together in the World", European Journal of Social Theory, 10, (2).
 2005, "The Two Bodies of May '68: In Common, in Person", in A. Sica and S. Turner (eds.), The Disobedient Generation: Social Theorists in the Sixties, University of Chicago Press.
 2000 (with M. Lamont), "Introduction: Toward A Renewed Comparative Cultural Sociology", in M. Lamont and L. Thévenot (eds.), Rethinking Comparative Cultural Sociology: Repertoires of Evaluation in France and the United States, Cambridge University Press.
 2000 (with M. Lamont), "Exploring the French and American Polity", in M. Lamont and L. Thévenot (eds.), Rethinking Comparative Cultural Sociology: Repertoires of Evaluation in France and the United States, Cambridge University Press.
 2000 (with M. Moody), "Comparing Models of Strategy, Interests, and the Public Good in French and American Environmental Disputes", in M. Lamont and L. Thévenot (eds.), Rethinking Comparative Cultural Sociology: Repertoires of Evaluation in France and the United States, Cambridge University Press.
 2000 (with M. Moody, C. Lafaye), "Forms of Valuing Nature: Arguments and Modes of Justification in French and American Environmental Disputes", in M. Lamont and L. Thévenot (eds.), Rethinking Comparative Cultural Sociology: Repertoires of Evaluation in France and the United States, Cambridge University Press.

References

External links
Laurent Thévenot at the Centre Georg Simmel: http://centregeorgsimmel.ehess.fr/en/membres/membres-statutaires/laurent-thevenot
Papers 1:  https://www.researchgate.net/profile/Laurent-Thevenot
Papers 2:  https://ehess.academia.edu/LaurentTHEVENOT
 An interview with Laurent Thévenot: On engagement, critique, commonality, and power – special issue of European Journal of Social Theory on the French Pragmatic Sociology with an interview by Paul Blokker and Andrea Brighenti
 Critically Differing in a Common City – lecture at the Faculty of Social Sciences of the Charles University in Prague

Living people
French sociologists
1949 births
School for Advanced Studies in the Social Sciences alumni
École Polytechnique alumni